Undecaprenyl-phosphate glucose phosphotransferase (GumD) is an enzyme with systematic name . This enzyme catalyses the following chemical reaction

 UDP-glucose +   UMP + 

The enzyme is involved in biosynthesis of xanthan.

References

External links 
 

EC 2.7.8